Apamea devastator, the glassy cutworm, is a moth of the family Noctuidae. The moth is found in northeastern North America, including Nova Scotia, Alberta, New York, Ohio, and Massachusetts.

The wingspan is 35 to 40 mm. The moth flies from May to September, depending on the location.

The larva, a cutworm, feeds on various grasses. It is subterranean and attacks the roots and basal stems of its hosts.

References

Apamea (moth)
Moths of North America
Moths described in 1819